The following is a list of footballers who have made at least 500 domestic league appearances in Scottish league football. This includes the appearances and goals of players, in the Scottish Professional Football League, or its predecessor competitions.

List of players

See also
List of footballers in England by number of league appearances
List of footballers in England by number of league goals
List of footballers in Scotland by number of league goals

References

Scotland league appearances
Appearances
Football records and statistics in Scotland